Tommaso Asti (died 1512) was an Italian Roman Catholic prelate who served as Bishop of Forlì (1485–1512).

On 3 September 1485, Tommaso Asti was appointed  Bishop of Forlì by Pope Innocent VIII .

He served as Bishop of Forlì until his death in 1512.

References 

15th-century Italian Roman Catholic bishops
16th-century Italian Roman Catholic bishops
Bishops appointed by Pope Innocent VIII
1512 deaths
Bishops of Forlì